Bentheim-Limburg was a short-lived County of the Holy Roman Empire, created as a partition of Bentheim-Steinfurt in 1606. It was remerged to Bentheim-Steinfurt in 1632.

Count of Bentheim-Limburg (1606–1632)
Conrad Gumbert (1606–1632)

Populated places established in 1606
Counties of the Holy Roman Empire
1606 establishments in the Holy Roman Empire